Fraxinus caroliniana, the pop ash, Florida ash, swamp ash, Carolina ash, or water ash, is a species of ash tree native from Cuba through the subtropical southeastern United States from southern Virginia to Texas. It was originally described by the botanist Philip Miller. It is a small tree about 40 ft. Leaves are compound, opposite, 7–12 in long, leaflets 5–7 in, ovate to oblong, coarsely serrate or entire, 3–6 in long, 2–3 in wide. Fruit is frequently 3-winged (samara) with flat seed portion; seed sometimes a bright violet color. It is the smallest of eastern North American ash species, wood light, soft, weak, 22 lbs./cu.ft. Typical to coastal swamps and subtropical lowlands. Like other species in the section Melioides, Fraxinus caroliniana is dioecious, with male and female flowers produced on separate individuals.

The tree is threatened by the emerald ash borer, an invasive species of beetle.

Climate Change and Swamp Ash

Flooding 
Along the lower Mississippi River, flooding occurs during winter and spring. The trees are able to withstand the seasonal flooding. However, flooding has intensified due to climate change. The National Oceanic and Atmospheric Administration found the 2019 spring floods along the Mississippi River were among some of the costliest in history. Lee Jones of J. M. Jones Lumber Company says “The river has been up for so long, and for so much, that it’s killed a lot of the trees”.

Future Concerns 
The emerald ash borer are an invasive species from Asia. The beetles damage the trees by boring holes into the wood, damaging the trees' water and nutrient transport system. These beetles have spread to 35 U.S. states and five Canadian provinces. The emerald ash borer has not yet reached the lower Mississippi, but Jennifer Koch, a Forest Service biologist, says “it’s only a matter of time” before it affects the swamp ash.

Use as a Tonewood  
Ash, particularly swamp ash because of its figure, is a choice of material for electric guitar bodies and, less commonly, for acoustic guitar bodies, known for its bright, cutting edge and sustaining quality. Some Fender Stratocasters and Telecasters are made of ash, (such as Bruce Springsteen's Telecaster on the Born to Run album cover), as an alternative to alder. 

Ash is a Tonewood commonly used in the manufacture of electric guitars. It exhibits a pronounced bright tone with a scooped midrange. It's lightweight, easy to work and sand, accepts glue, stain, paint and finish very well and is inexpensive. All this has made it a favourite of large factories mass producing instruments. The Fender musical instrument company has been continuously and uninterruptedly using Ash to make electric guitars since 1956. Swamp ash is used a lot in guitar building because of its figure. It is a choice of material for electric guitar bodies and, less commonly, for acoustic guitar bodies, known for its bright, cutting edge and sustaining quality. Some Fender Stratocasters and Telecasters are made of ash, (such as Bruce Springsteen's Telecaster on the Born to Run album cover), as an alternative to alder.

References

caroliniana
Trees of the Southeastern United States
Trees of the South-Central United States
Plants described in 1768
Trees of Cuba
Trees of the Caribbean
Taxa named by Philip Miller
Dioecious plants